Velyke Orikhove is an urban-type settlement in Makiivka Municipality in Donetsk Raion of Donetsk Oblast in eastern Ukraine.

Demographics
Native language as of the Ukrainian Census of 2001:
 Ukrainian 23.63%
 Russian 74.67%
 Belarusian 0.52%
 Romanian 0.13%

References

Urban-type settlements in Donetsk Raion